The Mtwara–Dar es Salaam Natural Gas Pipeline (MDNGP), is a pipeline that transports natural gas from Tanzania's natural gas fields in Mnazi Bay, Mtwara Region to Dar es Salaam.

Location

Background
As of October 2015, Tanzania's total electricity generation capacity stood at 1,500 MW. In 2014, hydro-power generation represented 33 percent of total capacity. Due to prolonged drought, hydro turned out to be an unreliable power source for the country. 
 In order to diversify the national energy pool, and to take advantage of the vast natural gas resources onshore and offshore in the Mtwara and Lindi regions, a natural gas pipeline was designed and constructed, to deliver the natural gas to Dar es Salaam for use in power generation, industrial applications, household cooking and in propulsion of transport vehicles.

Technical details
The main pipeline from Madimba in Mtwara Region, to Dar es Salaam, measures  in diameter. At Somanga, in Lindi Region the main pipeline is joined by a smaller  pipeline delivering natural gas from Songo Songo Island. Both processing plants, one in Madimba and the other in Songo Songo are two trains (processing units) each and together are capable of processing  of natural gas every 24 hours.

Construction, funding and time table
The construction contract was awarded to China Petroleum and Technology Development Company, a subsidiary of China National Petroleum Company, with a US$1.225 billion concessional loan from Exim Bank of China. The Tanzania Petroleum Development Corporation invested US$274.492 million into the project. Construction began in June 2013, with commissioning in October 2015. The contract included the construction of the two-train gas processing plant in Madimba Village, Mtwara Region.

See also
 Tanesco
 Tanzania Liquefied Natural Gas Project
 Tanzania Petroleum Development Corporation
 List of power stations in Tanzania
 Uganda–Tanzania Crude Oil Pipeline

References

External links
Tanzania launches project to pipe natural gas to capital

Energy infrastructure in Africa
Natural gas pipelines in Tanzania
Energy infrastructure in Tanzania
Mtwara Region
Lindi Region
Pwani Region
Dar es Salaam Region
Fuels infrastructure in Tanzania